Doctor Who Files is a series of books for young readers related to the long-running BBC science fiction television programme Doctor Who.

Each book in the series has been published in hardback with a hexagonal cover cut-out through which the featured character can be seen on the inside page. Designed for young readers, the books have numerous photographic illustrations and are broken into short sections of text with fold-out pages featuring a "Test your Knowledge" section relating to the preceding text. Each title also features a new short story.

Books

References 

Novels based on Doctor Who
Books about Doctor Who